MOA-2007-BLG-400L  is a star located approximately 20000 light-years away in the constellation of Sagittarius. This star is presumed to be a red dwarf with a spectral type of M3V, based on its mass of 0.35 MS.

Planetary system
In September 2008, the discovery of an extrasolar planet was announced by the Microlensing Follow Up Network (μFUN)  and the Microlensing Observations in Astrophysics (MOA) Collaboration. This planet was detected by the gravitational microlensing method based on an event recorded in September 2007.

See also
 List of extrasolar planets
 MOA-2007-BLG-192L

References
 web preprint

External links
 MOA-2007-BLG-400 Event

M-type main-sequence stars
Planetary systems with one confirmed planet
Sagittarius (constellation)
Gravitational lensing